Cecil Lake is a lake in the Peace River Country of northeastern British Columbia, Canada.  It was named in 1910 for Major Cecil Morton Roberts who was Surveyor-General of British Columbia in that year.  The community of Cecil Lake was named for this lake and is just south of it.

References

Lakes of British Columbia
Peace River Country
Peace River Land District